Healthcare professional credentials are credentials awarded to many healthcare practitioners as a way to standardize the level of education and ability to provide care.

Clinicians 
 Physician
 Bachelor of Medicine, Bachelor of Surgery (MBBS)
 Doctor of Medicine (M.D.)
 Doctor of Osteopathic Medicine (D.O.)
 Dentist
 Bachelor of Dental Surgery (BDS)
 Doctor of Dental Medicine (DMD)
 Doctor of Dental Surgery (DDS)
 Optometrist
 Doctor of Optometry (OD)
 Podiatrist
 Doctor of Podiatry (DPM)
 Chiropractor
 Doctor of Chiropractic (DC)
 Physician Assistant (PA)
 Doctor of Medical Science (D.Med.Sc.), (D.M.Sc.)
 Master of Medical Science (M.Med.Sc), (M.M.Sc.)
 Master of Physician Assistant Studies (M.P.A.S.)
 Professional (Second-entry) Bachelor of Science in Physician Assistant (B.Sc.PA.), (B.H.Sc.PA)
 Pharmacist (R.Ph.)
Doctor of Pharmacy (PharmD)
Master of Pharmacy (MPharm) 
Bachelor of Pharmacy (B.Pharm)

Medical Researchers 
 Philosophiae Doctor (Ph.D.)
 Dr. mr. (Doctor of Medical Research)

Allied Health Professionals 
 Respiratory practitioner (aka "respiratory therapist" or "respiratory care practitioner") (RRT, CRT)
 Associate of Science in Respiratory Therapy (ASRT)
 Bachelor of Science in Respiratory Therapy (BSRT)
 Master of Science in Respiratory Therapy (MSRT)
 Paramedic (NRP)
 Emergency Medical Technician (EMT-B, EMT-I, EMT-IV, EMT-I/99, EMT-I/89, NREMT, NRAEMT)
 Athletic Trainer  (ATC)
 Bachelor of Science in Athletic Trainer  (BS)
 Masters of Athletic Training  (MSAT, MAT)
 CAATE
 Board of Certification, Inc.  (ATC)
 Dietician
 Registered Dietitian (RD)
 Registered Dietitian Nutritionist (RDN)
 Radiographer and specialties
Varies by country, see main article.
 Occupational therapist
 Master of Occupational Therapy (MOT)
 Doctor of Occupational Therapy (OTD)
 Physical therapist
 Master of Physical Therapy (MPT)
 Doctor of Physical Therapy (DPT)
 Speech therapist/Speech-Language Pathologist
 Speech and Language Pathologist (SLP)
 Music therapist
 Board Certified Music Therapist (MT-BC)
 Master of Music Therapy (MMT)
 Surgical technologist
 Associate of Applied Science in Surgical Technology
Medical Laboratory Technician/Medical Laboratory Scientist/Medical Technologist (MLT, MLS, MT)
Associate of Science in Medical (Clinical) Laboratory Sciences (ASMLS, ASCLS, degrees, MLT Certification Eligible if from a NAACLS accredited program)
Bachelor of Science in Medical (Clinical) Laboratory Sciences (BSMT, BSMLS, BSCLS degrees, MLS Certification Eligible if from a NAACLS accredited program)
Masters of Science in Medical (Clinical) Laboratory Sciences (MSMLS, MSCLS degrees)
Doctor of Science in Clinical Laboratory Sciences (DSCLS degree)

Nursing 

 Registered nurse (RN)
 Doctor of Nursing Practice (DNP)
 Master of Science in Nursing (MSN)
 Bachelor of Science in Nursing (BSN)
 Associate of Science in Nursing (ASN)
 Diploma in Nursing
 Practical nurse (PN, LPN, VN)
 Certified anesthesiologist assistant (CAA)

Assistants
 Nurse aide (CNA)
 Nurse technician (CNT)
 Care partner (CP)
 Medical Assistants
 Certified Medical Assistant (CMA)
 Certified Medical Assistant - Admin (CMA-A)
 Certified Medical Assistant - Clinical (CMA-C)
 Certified Medical Assistant - Admin and Clinical (CMA-AC)
 Registered Medical Assistant (RMA)
 Medical Assistant (MA) 
 Certified Clinical Medical Assistant (CCMA) 
 Certified Medical Administrative Assistant (CMAA)
 Pharmacy Technician
 Certified Pharmacy Technician (CPhT)

Therapy assistants 
Physical therapy assistant (PTA)
Associate of Applied Science in Physical Therapist Assistant  
Occupational therapy assistant
Associate of Applied Science in Occupational Therapy Assistant(AAS OTA) (COTA)

Alternative Medicine
 Naturopaths
 Naturopathy (ND)

References